The 2016 FC Taraz season is the 8th successive season that the club will play in the Kazakhstan Premier League, the highest tier of association football in Kazakhstan, and 23rd in total. Taraz will play in the Kazakhstan Premier League as well as the Kazakhstan Cup.

Squad

Reserve team

Transfers

Winter

In:

Out:

Summer

In:

Out:

Friendlies

Competitions

Kazakhstan Premier League

Regular season

Results summary

Results by round

Results

League table

Relegation round

Results summary

Results by round

Results

League table

Relegation play-off

Kazakhstan Cup

Squad statistics

Appearances and goals

|-
|colspan="14"|Players away from Taraz on loan:
|-
|colspan="14"|Players who appeared for Taraz that left during the season:

|}

Goal scorers

Disciplinary record

References

External links
Official Website
Official VK

FC Taraz seasons
Taraz